John Baldwin may refer to:

Military
Jack Baldwin (RAF officer) (John Eustice Arthur Baldwin, 1892–1975), senior British Royal Air Force officer
John Robert Baldwin (1918–1952), RAF fighter ace of the Second World War
John A. Baldwin Jr. (born 1933), American admiral

Politics and government
Sir John Baldwin (judge) (died 1545), Chief Justice of the Common Pleas, 1535–1545
John Baldwin (congressman) (1772–1850), U.S. Representative from Connecticut
John Brown Baldwin (1820–1873), Politician in Virginia during the American Civil War
John Denison Baldwin (1809–1883), U.S. Representative from Massachusetts and writer on anthropology
John Harvey Baldwin (1851–1924), American lawyer and politician
John Baldwin (Missouri politician) (1843–1934), Missouri senator
John F. Baldwin Jr. (1915–1966), U.S. Representative from California
John Baldwin (MP) (died 1691), English politician
John R. Baldwin (1854–1897), Massachusetts politician
J. B. Munro (born John Munro, 1936–2018), New Zealand politician

Sports
John Baldwin Sr. (active 1972), American figure skater
John Baldwin (boxer) (born 1949), American boxer
John Baldwin (figure skater) (born 1973), American pairs figure skater with Rena Inoue

Other people
John Baldwin (educator) (1799–1884), founder of Baldwin-Wallace College, Baker University, Baldwin Boys High School and Baldwin Girls High School
John Baldwin (trade unionist) (1923–2007), British trade unionist
John Paul Jones (musician) (John Baldwin, born 1946), bassist and keyboard player for Led Zeppelin
John C. Baldwin (1948–2016), American cardiac surgeon and academic administrator
John E. Baldwin (1931–2010), British astronomer
John Loraine Baldwin (1809–1896), author on the games of whist and badminton
John Thomas Baldwin (1910–1974), American botanist
John W. Baldwin (1929–2015), historian, specialist of Philip II of France

See also 
Jack Baldwin (disambiguation)
Baldwin (name)